Natta is a genus of jumping spiders that was first described by Ferdinand Anton Franz Karsch in 1879.  it contains only two species, found only in Africa and Yemen: N. chionogaster and N. horizontalis.

References

External links
 Photograph of N. horizontalis

Salticidae genera
Salticidae
Spiders of Africa